Aihar may refer to:

 Aihar, Raebareli, a village in India
 Aihar, Barisal, a village in Bangladesh
 Victoria Aihar, a Uruguayan author